Mid-term parliamentary elections were held in Cuba on 1 November 1926 in order to fill half the seats in the House of Representatives.

References

Cuba
Parliamentary elections in Cuba
1926 in Cuba
November 1926 events
Election and referendum articles with incomplete results